Jefferson Franklin Colbert, known as J. Frank Colbert (May 28, 1882 – May 20, 1949), was a Democratic politician and Georgist based in Webster Parish, Louisiana. He served in the Louisiana House of Representatives from 1920 to 1925. he had previously and later again served on the Webster Parish Police Jury. During the Great Depression, he became involved in the Georgist movement and published an article about its single tax proposal.

Colbert also served from 1944 to 1946 as the mayor of the small city of Minden, the seat of government of Webster Parish in northwestern Louisiana. He later worked in real estate.

Background

Colbert was born in Webster Parish in 1882 to John A. Colbert and his third wife, the former Sarah Eliza Taylor.

Political career

Henry Georg movement

Mayoral service
Colbert won the primary for the mayor's office by 26 votes, 731 votes (50.9 percent) to 705 (49.1 percent). Given Democratic dominance of the state, and disenfranchisement of most African Americans, who had supported Republicans, Colbert won the general election and served for two years. He did not seek a second two-year term as mayor in 1946.

Death

References

1882 births
1949 deaths
Mayors of Minden, Louisiana
Democratic Party members of the Louisiana House of Representatives
Louisiana Tech University alumni
Journalists from Louisiana
Businesspeople from Louisiana
American real estate businesspeople
Burials at Minden Cemetery
20th-century American politicians
20th-century American businesspeople